Buguggiate is a comune (municipality) in the Province of Varese in the Italian region Lombardy, located about  northwest of Milan and about  southwest of Varese.

Buguggiate borders the following municipalities: Azzate, Brunello, Gazzada Schianno, Varese.

References

External links

Official website

Cities and towns in Lombardy